The Men's 400 metre freestyle competition of the 2018 European Aquatics Championships was held on 3 August 2018.

Records
Before the competition, the existing world and championship records were as follows.

Results

Heats
The heats were started at 09:50.

Final
The final was held at 17:09.

References

Men's 400 metre freestyle